Kusanagi Stadium is a multi-purpose stadium in Shizuoka, Japan.  It is currently used mostly for baseball matches.  The stadium was originally opened in 1930 and has a capacity of 30,000 spectators.

References

External links
l Stadium picture

Baseball venues in Japan
Multi-purpose stadiums in Japan
Sports venues in Shizuoka Prefecture
Buildings and structures in Shizuoka (city)
Sports venues completed in 1930
1930 establishments in Japan